Paid in Full is a lost 1919 American silent drama film starring Pauline Frederick and directed by Emile Chautard. It was produced by Famous Players-Lasky and released by Paramount Pictures. The film is based on the hit 1908 Broadway stage play Paid in Full by Eugene Walter which starred Lillian Albertson. Two previous silent films appeared in 1910 as a short and in 1914 as a feature.

Cast
Pauline Frederick as Emma Brooks
Robert Cain as Joe Brooks
Wyndham Standing as Jimsy Smith
Frank Losee as Captain Williams
Jane Farrell as Mrs. Harris
Vera Beresford as Beth Harris

References

External links

Lithograph lobby poster

1919 films
American silent feature films
Lost American films
American films based on plays
Films directed by Emile Chautard
1919 drama films
American black-and-white films
Remakes of American films
Silent American drama films
1919 lost films
Lost drama films
1910s American films